Peel Session TX 09/03/00 is an EP by Mira Calix, released by Warp Records in 2000. The label released a number of sessions by their artists, including Autechre and Boards of Canada, recorded for the renowned John Peel show on BBC Radio 1.

Mira Calix's Peel Session was recorded on 9 March 2000, and released in September of that year.

Track listing

Mira Calix albums
Peel Sessions recordings
2000 live albums
2000 EPs
Warp (record label) live albums
Live EPs
Warp (record label) EPs
Live albums by South African artists